Paulus Powell (1809 – June 10, 1874) was a nineteenth-century politician from Virginia.

Biography
Born in Amherst County, Virginia, Powell attended private schools as a child and went on to attend Amherst College. He held several local offices and was a member of the Virginia House of Delegates from 1843 to 1849. He was elected a Democrat to the United States House of Representatives in 1848, serving from 1849 to 1859. After being unsuccessful for reelection in 1858, he returned to the House of Delegates in 1863 and 1864. Powell died in Amherst, Virginia on June 10, 1874 and was interred in the family cemetery on his brother-in-law's estate called "Kenmore" near Amherst.

Electoral history

1849; Powell was elected to the U.S. House of Representatives with 50.87% of the vote, defeating Whig William Leftwich Goggin.
1851; Powell was re-elected with 51.46% of the vote, defeating Whig Goggin.
1853; Powell was re-elected with 52.49% of the vote, defeating Whig Alexander Mosely.
1855; Powell was re-elected with 56.68% of the vote, defeating an American identified only as Ligon.
1857; Powell was re-elected unopposed.
1859; Powell lost his bid for re-election.

External links

1809 births
1874 deaths
People from Amherst County, Virginia
American people of Welsh descent
Democratic Party members of the Virginia House of Delegates
Democratic Party members of the United States House of Representatives from Virginia
19th-century American politicians